Farfar (also Romanized as Fārfār; also known as Parpar and Perper) is a village in Zolbin Rural District, Yamchi District, Marand County, East Azerbaijan Province, Iran. At the 2006 census, its population was 723, in 188 families.

References 

Populated places in Marand County